Akop Stepanyan (born May 6, 1986) is a Russian mixed martial artist of Armenian heritage who competed in the featherweight and lightweight divisions of Bellator Fighting Championships and Absolute Championship Berkut.

Mixed martial arts career

M-1 Global
Stepanyan lost via submission (armbar) to Zagalav Mahachev at M-1 Challenge - 2009 Selections 2 in the first round.

Post-M-1 Global
Stepanyan lost via unanimous decision (30–28, 29–28, 29–28) to Djamal Kurbanov at FEFoMP - Vladivostok Pankration Open Cup 2009 on April 25, 2009.

Return to M-1 Global
Stepanyan lost via submission (rear-naked choke) to Magomed Magomedov at M-1 Challenge - 2009 Selections 5 in the first round.

Stepanyan was released from the M-1 after going 0-2 in the promotion.

Bellator MMA
In July, Stepanyan signed in Bellator.

Stepanyan was then entered into the season seven featherweight tournament. His quarterfinal opponent was Brazilian Jiu-Jitsu black belt Wagnney Fabiano at Bellator 76. He lost the bout via first round armbar submission.

Stepanyan next faced former Sengoku Featherweight Champion Marlon Sandro in season eight featherweight tournament on February 7, 2013 at Bellator 88. He lost the fight via controversial majority decision.

Stepanyan faced Chris Saunders on March 7, 2013 at Bellator 92. He won the fight via TKO in the third round.

Stepanyan was expected to face Shahbulat Shamhalaev on September 13, 2013 at Bellator 99. However, Shamhalaev withdrew from the tournament and was replaced by Justin Wilcox. Stepanyan dominated the first round, but was stopped by a rear naked choke submission in the second round.

Stepanyan faced Mike Richman at Bellator 106 on November 2, 2013. Stepanyan had Richman in trouble early in the fight, but lost in the first round via TKO.

League S-70
After Bellator dismissal Akop Stepanyan faced ex-UFC fighter Andre Winner. He won via unanimous decision.

Absolute Championship Berkut
Stepanyan signed a four-fight deal with the ACB in February, 2017.

Stepanyan faced Mukhamed Kokov on April 15, 2017 at ACB 57: Payback. He lost the fight via submission in the third round.

Stepanyan faced  Felipe Cruz on June 17, 2017 at ACB 62. He won the fight via knockout in the first round.

Championships and accomplishments

ARG (Army Hand-to-Hand Combat)
Russian Union of Martial Arts
Russian National Champion of Army Hand-to-Hand Combat

Kickboxing
Kick-Boxing Federation of Russia
Russian National Champion
Silver Medalist European Championship 2004

Taekwondo
Taekwondo Union of Russia
Russian National Champion 2002

Mixed martial arts record

|-
|Loss
| align=center|
| Shamil Gasanov
| Submission (guillotine choke)
| ProFC 69
| 
| align=center| 1
| align=center| 1:40
| Rostov-on-Don, Russia
| 
|-
|Loss
| align=center|
| Roman Silagadze
| Submission (arm-triangle choke)
| AMC Fight Nights Global 100
| 
| align=center| 2
| align=center| 4:44
| Moscow, Russia
| 
|-
|Win
| align=center| 27–11 (1)
| Mikhail Gogitidze
| TKO (punches)
| AMC Fight Nights Global 99
| 
| align=center| 2
| align=center| 0:59
| Moscow, Russia
|
|-
|Win
| align=center| 26–11 (1)
| Shahin Najafi
| TKO (punches)
| GFC 22
| 
| align=center| 2
| align=center| 1:35
| Krasnodar, Russia
|
|-
|NC
| align=center| 25–11 (1)
| Elnur Agaev
| Injury (doctors stoppage)
| MFP 226
| 
| align=center| 1
| align=center| 4:07
| Khabarovsk, Russia
| 
|-
|Loss
| align=center| 25–11
| Magomed Sulumov
| Decision (unanimous)
| ACB 89: Aguev vs. Townsend
| 
| align=center| 3
| align=center| 5:00
| Krasnodar, Russia
|
|-
|Loss
| align=center| 25–10
| Andrew Fisher
| TKO (injury)
| ACB 74: Aguev vs. Townsend
| 
| align=center| 2
| align=center| 1:01
| Vienna, Austria
|
|-
|Win
| align=center| 25–9
| Felipe Cruz
| KO (spinning heel kick)
| ACB 62: Stepanyan vs. Cruz
| 
| align=center| 1
| align=center| 4:38
| Rostov-on-Don, Russia
|
|-
|Loss
| align=center| 24–9
| Mukhamed Kokov
| Submission (kimura)
| ACB 57: Payback
| 
| align=center| 3
| align=center| 0:51
| Moscow, Russia
| 
|-
| Win
| align=center| 24–8
| Thiago Meller
| Decision (split)
| League S-70: Plotforma 7th
| 
| align=center| 3
| align=center| 5:00
| Sochi, Russia
| 
|-
| Win
| align=center| 23–8
| Will Chope
| Decision (split)
| Abu Dhabi Warriors 4
| 
| align=center| 3
| align=center| 5:00
| Abu Dhabi, United Arab Emirates
| 
|-
| Loss
| align=center| 22–8
| Vener Galiev
| Submission (rear-naked choke)
| Fight Nights Global 45: Galiev vs. Stepanyan
| 
| align=center| 3
| align=center| 3:16
| Ufa, Russia
| 
|-
| Win
| align=center| 22–7
| Leonardo Laiola
| TKO (punches)
| Octagon Fighting Sensation 6: Best of the Best
| 
| align=center| 1
| align=center| 4:59
| Moscow, Russia
| 
|-
| Win
| align=center| 21–7
| Sung Jo Jong
| KO (punches)
| MFP: Cup of the Sakhalin Administration Head 2015
| 
| align=center| 1
| align=center| 0:11
| Yuzhno-Sakhalinsk, Russia
|
|-
| Win
| align=center| 20–7
| Andre Winner
| Decision (unanimous)
| League S-70: Russia vs. World 
| 
| align=center| 3
| align=center| 5:00
| Sochi, Krasnodar krai, Russia
| 
|-
| Win
| align=center| 19–7
| Helson Henriques
| Decision (unanimous)
| FEFoMP: Mayor's Cup 2015
| 
| align=center| 3
| align=center| 5:00
| Khabarovsk, Russia
| 
|-
| Win
| align=center| 18–7
| Mohamed Hassan Badawy
| TKO (punches)
| Octagon Fighting Sensation 4: Challenge the Best
| 
| align=center| 2
| align=center| 4:19
| Yaroslavl, Russia
| 
|-
| Win
| align=center| 17–7
| Clayton Henriques
| Decision (unanimous)
| FEFoMP: Pankration & Fight Nights 2
| 
| align=center| 3
| align=center| 5:00
| Vladivostok, Russia
| 
|-
| Win
| align=center| 16–7
| Eddie Yagin
| KO (head kick)
| FEFoMP: Russia's MMA Supercup 
| 
| align=center| 2
| align=center| 4:44
| Khabarovsk, Russia
| 
|-
| Win
| align=center| 15–7
| Mikhail Kislica
| TKO (body punch)
| ProFC 56: Baltic Challenge 6
| 
| align=center| 1
| align=center| 4:41
| Kaliningrad, Russia
| 
|-
| Win
| align=center| 14–7
| Anatoli Angielovskyi
| TKO (spinning back kick and punches)
| OFS - Octogan Fighting Sensation 2
| 
| align=center| 1
| align=center| 2:47
| Yaroslavl, Russia
| 
|-
| Loss
| align=center| 13–7
| Mike Richman
| TKO (punches)
| Bellator 106
| 
| align=center| 1
| align=center| 4:05
| Long Beach, California, United States
| 
|-
| Loss
| align=center| 13–6
| Justin Wilcox
| Technical Submission (rear-naked choke)
| Bellator 99
| 
| align=center| 2
| align=center| 2:20
| Temecula, California, United States
| 
|-
| Win
| align=center| 13–5
| Chris Saunders
| TKO (body kick and punches)
| Bellator 92
| 
| align=center| 3
| align=center| 3:55
| Temecula, California, United States
| 
|-
| Loss
| align=center| 12–5
| Marlon Sandro
| Decision (majority)
| Bellator 88
| 
| align=center| 3
| align=center| 5:00
| Duluth, Georgia, United States
| Bellator Season 8 Featherweight Tournament Quarterfinal.
|-
| Loss
| align=center| 12–4
| Wagnney Fabiano
| Submission (armbar)
| Bellator 76
| 
| align=center| 1
| align=center| 3:24
| Windsor, Ontario, Canada
| Bellator Season 7 Featherweight Tournament Quarterfinal. Return to Featherweight.
|-
| Win
| align=center| 12–3
| Akhmet Aliev
| KO (punch)
| League S-70: Russian Championship Finals
| 
| align=center| 1
| align=center| 2:11
| Sochi, Krasnodar Krai, Russia
| S-70 2012 Russian Lightweight Tournament Final.
|-
| Win
| align=center| 11–3
| Anatoliy Pokrovsky
| TKO (body kick)
| League S-70: Russian Championship Semifinals
| 
| align=center| 3
| align=center| 1:50
| Moscow, Moscow Oblast, Russia
| S-70 2012 Russian Lightweight Tournament Semifinal.
|-
| Win
| align=center| 10–3
| Antti Virtanen
| Submission (guillotine choke)
| Lappeenranta Fight Night 7
| 
| align=center| 1
| align=center| 0:53
| Lappeenranta, South Karelia, Finland
| 
|-
| Win
| align=center| 9–3
| Yevgeniy Lakhin
| TKO (body punch)
| League S-70: Russian Championship Second Round
| 
| align=center| 3
| align=center| 3:19
| Omsk, Omsk Oblast, Russia
| S-70 2012 Russian Lightweight Tournament Second Round.
|-
| Win
| align=center| 8–3
| Dmitriy Ushkanov
| Decision (split)
| FEFoMP - Battle of Empires
| 
| align=center| 2
| align=center| 5:00
| Khabarovsk, Khabarovsk Krai, Russia
| 
|-
| Win
| align=center| 7–3
| Babyrbek Samiev
| Submission (guillotine choke)
| FWR - Fights With Rules 3
| 
| align=center| 1
| align=center| 2:35
| Ufa, Republic of Bashkortostan, Russia
| 
|-
| Win
| align=center| 6–3
| Atchin Chaoshen Ne
| Decision (unanimous)
| FEFoMP - Mayor's Cup 2011
| 
| align=center| 2
| align=center| 5:00
| Khabarovsk, Khabarovsk Krai, Russia
| 
|-
| Win
| align=center| 5–3
| Aleksey Ershik
| Decision (unanimous)
| FEFoMP - Amur Challenge
| 
| align=center| 2
| align=center| 5:00
| Blagoveshchensk, Amur Oblast, Russia
| 
|-
| Win
| align=center| 4–3
| Mikhail Drinovski
| Decision (unanimous)
| Northwestern League of Combat Sambo: Tournament in Memory of Private Korzun
| 
| align=center| 2
| align=center| 5:00
| Saint Petersburg, Leningrad Oblast, Russia
| 
|-
| Win
| align=center| 3–3
| Kazbek Magomedov
| TKO (punches)
| Northwestern League of Combat Sambo - Tournament in Memory of Partisan German
| 
| align=center| 1
| align=center| 3:24
| Saint Petersburg, Leningrad Oblast, Russia
| 
|-
| Win
| align=center| 2–3
| Andrei Shpota
| KO (punch)
| ProFC - Union Nation Cup 5
| 
| align=center| 1
| align=center| 3:42
| Nalchik, Kabardino-Balkar Republic, Russia
| 
|-
| Win
| align=center| 1–3
| Djamal Kurbanov
| KO (wheel kick)
| FEFoMP - Mayor's Cup in Pankration
| 
| align=center| 3
| align=center| 1:09
| Vladivostok, Primorsky Krai, Russia
| 
|-
| Loss
| align=center| 0–3
| Magomed Magomedov
| Submission (rear-naked choke)
| M-1 Challenge: 2009 Selections 5
| 
| align=center| 1
| align=center| 3:30
| Saint Petersburg, Leningrad Oblast, Russia
| 
|-
| Loss
| align=center| 0–2
| Djamal Kurbanov
| Decision (unanimous)
| FEFoMP - Vladivostok Pankration Open Cup 2009
| 
| align=center| 3
| align=center| 5:00
| Vladivostok, Primorsky Krai, Russia
| 
|-
| Loss
| align=center| 0–1
| Zagalav Mahachev
| Submission (armbar)
| M-1 Challenge: 2009 Selections 2
| 
| align=center| 1
| align=center| 4:55
| Saint Petersburg, Leningrad Oblast, Russia
|

References

External links

Living people
1986 births
Russian people of Armenian descent
Russian male mixed martial artists
Russian male taekwondo practitioners
Sportspeople from Yerevan
Armenian male mixed martial artists
Armenian male taekwondo practitioners
Mixed martial artists utilizing taekwondo
Mixed martial artists utilizing boxing
Mixed martial artists utilizing ARB